Zoya Cherkassky-Nnadi (formerly Zoya Cherkassky) is an Israeli artist, born in Kyiv in 1976, who migrated to Israel in 1991. Her works focus on her personal experiences, including childhood in the Soviet Union and migration to Israel. Cherkassky-Nnadi also helped found the New Barbizon Group with four other painters, all born in the former USSR.

Soviet childhood 
In 2015, Cherkassky-Nnadi created a collection of art pieces depicting everyday scenes she observed throughout her childhood in the Soviet Ukraine. The works display particularities of her own childhood, such as her nightly routine of watching out the window for her mother to return home from work, as well as more general norms of Soviet life at that time, such as the cramped apartments that many people lived in, and the food that was commonly enjoyed during May Day festivities. "It’s childhood so even if it’s something unpleasant you remember it with some sort of nostalgia," she said, in one of her first ever English-language interviews.

Cherkassky-Nnadi was the granddaughter of a food store manager, so she had access to a wider variety of foods than many of her peers.  This can be seen in some of her works revolving around food, such as "May Day" and "Tomatoes."  Cherkassky-Nnadi worked on this collection while she was pregnant with her first child, and the artist feels this contributed to the warmth of the pieces.

Pravda: Immigrating to Israel 
Cherkassky-Nnadi and her family immigrated to Israel in 1991, just two weeks before the collapse of the USSR. In 2010, Cherkassky-Nnadi began working on an exhibit entitled Pravda (truth), which was published in 2018, depicting the experience.  Similar to the Soviet Childhood exhibit, Pravda includes scenes from Cherkassky-Nnadi's own experience with immigrating, as well as scenarios that she portrays as a common experience for those migrating from the former Soviet Union to Israel at that time.  Some of these scenes include the arrival of the new immigrants, like in her painting titled "New Victims," as well as the struggles these new immigrants faced when trying to fully integrate into the Jewish lifestyle, as can be seen in "The Rabbi's Deliquium" and "The Circumcision of Uncle Yasha." Some of the works in the exhibit also portray the discrimination some immigrants experienced.  Cherkassky-Nnadi specifically addresses some of the stereotypes placed on Russian women in Israel, such as her work entitled "Aliyah of the 1990s" which depicts the stereotype of the "Russian whore," or in her painting "Iztik," which not only shows the stereotypical Russian woman - fragile, blonde, fair-skinned - but also portrays a very stereotypical Mizrahi man, including the dark skin, large nose, and thick lips.  The painting was the subject of much criticism due to its portrayal of both groups of people, but the painting is intended to portray the habit of stereotyping that occurred in Israel at the time.

The New Barbizon Group 
In 2010, Cherkassky-Nnadi founded the group alongside four Soviet-born artists also living in Israel: Olga Kundina, Anna Lukashevsky, Asya Lukin, and Natalia Zourabova. The name refers to the Barbizon School of Painters that were active in France in the 19th century and encouraged realism both in painting and in perspective. A section of The New Barbizon Group's work incorporates African art, which allows them to stray away from typical Western standards, while also allowing them to immerse themselves in the prominent African culture that exists in different areas of Tel Aviv. African culture is so prominent in some parts of Israel due to the thousands of African asylum seekers that have entered Israel starting in 2006. Due to the artists' own experience with immigration and the feeling of not belonging, they can identify with the African immigrants who are going through the same things the artists themselves went through. The group's works focusing on these African immigrants show the different burdens they carry, whether that be racially-motivated violence, or the anxiety that comes when one feels that they do not belong, as these are all experiences that the artists also faced after their own immigration.

Reception 
Due to the controversial topics that Cherkassky-Nnadi addresses in her art, viewers have many different opinions.  While some viewers criticize the politics behind Cherkassky-Nnadi's art, others criticize the art itself, feeling that the extent to which she comments on society takes away from the actual art. Cherkassky-Nnadi has also received mixed responses to her portrayal of the Soviet Union; some critics fault her for depicting too much poverty and negativity, while others suggest she underplayed the poor living standards during that time. Cherkassky-Nnadi appreciates the responses to her work, and is glad they have sparked discussion on such important topics. Other critics point out the continuity of Cherkassky-Nnadi's visual language with late-Soviet artistic practices and the need to place her works within broader conceptual frameworks.

Inspiration 
While much of Cherkassky-Nnadi's work is based directly on her own experiences, some of her work is also inspired by other media.  A section of her work in Pravda  was inspired by the Russian film Little Vera.

Personal life 
Cherkassky-Nnadi is married to a Nigerian labour migrant.  Her husband is from Ngwo, Nigeria.  The couple have one child, a daughter named Vera.

References 

1976 births
Living people
Ukrainian expatriates in Israel
21st-century Ukrainian painters
Ukrainian women painters
Israeli women painters
21st-century Israeli painters